Senator Musto may refer to:

Anthony Musto (born 1968), Connecticut State Senate
Ray Musto (1929–2014), Pennsylvania State Senate
William Musto (1917–2006), New Jersey State Senate